Wang Hongkun (22 January 1909 – 20 August 1993) was a Chinese People's Liberation Army general and People's Liberation Army Navy admiral (海军上将), the first person to hold the rank.

References 

1909 births
1993 deaths
People's Liberation Army generals
People's Liberation Army Navy admirals
Members of the 10th Central Committee of the Chinese Communist Party
Members of the 9th Central Committee of the Chinese Communist Party
Political commissars of the People's Liberation Army Navy